= Tine Slabe =

Personal information
- Nationality: Slovenian
- Born: August 26, 1980 (age 46) Koper, Slovenia
- Education: Bachelor of Economics
- Height: 196 cm (6 ft 5 in)
- Website: www.tineslabe.com

Sport
- Country: Slovenia
- Sport: Windsurfing

Achievements and titles
- National finals: 2
- Updated on 21 April 2016

Tine Slabe, Slovenian windsurfer, born 26 August 1980, Koper.

He is competing: slalom, freestyle wave. He won Shimuni extreme 2010 and Canarian slalom tour 2011. He achieved to windsurf at Cape Horn, South America and holds national windsurfing record in speed windsurfing (71 km/h).

== Results ==
=== Achievements ===
- First human windsurf around Cape Horn, South America.
- National record speed windsurfing 71 km/h.

=== Competitions ===
Ranking	Place	Competition
==== 2011 ====
===== Professional Windsurfing Association =====
31. place	(Spain) Fuertaventura	
17. place	(Netherlands) Texel	Svetovno prvenstvo
===== Other competitions =====
4. place	(France) La Defi	(among 1000 competitors)
1. place	(Spain) Tenerife	Canarian slalom tour
3. place	(Morocco) Dakhla	Dakhla wind festival
==== 2010 ====
===== Professional Windsurfing Association =====
29. place	(Spain) Costa Brava	
35. place	(Spain) Fuertaventura	
44. place	(Turkey) Alaçatı	
31. place	(Germany) Sylt	
===== Other competitions =====
1. place		Shimuni extreme
6. place	(France) La Defi	(among 1000 competitors)
==== 2009 ====
===== Professional Windsurfing Association =====
25. place	(Austria) Podersforf	SP slalom
24. place	(South Korea) Uslan	
46. place	(Spain) Costa Brava	
27. place	(Spain) Gran Canaria	
22. place	(Spain) Fuertaventura	
==== 2008 ====
===== Professional Windsurfing Association =====
27. place	(Spain) Gran Canaria	Slalom
17. place	(Austria) Podersdorf	Freestyle
59. place	(Spain) Costa Brava	Slalom
34. place	(Spain) Fuertaventura	Slalom
22. place	(Spain) Fuertaventura	Freestyle
32. place	(Turkey) Alaçatı	Pegasus Airlines
===== Speed world cup =====
27. place	(Spain) Fuertaventura	Svetovno prvenstvo v hitrosti
===== European Freestyle Pro Tour =====
17. place	(Spain) Toro Andaluz	Tarifa
17. place	(Austria) Podersdorf	
===== Other competitions =====
11. place	(France) Leucate	Mondial du Vent
